The Shire of Mount Morgan was a local government area located in the Capricornia region of Central Queensland, Queensland, Australia, about  south of the regional city of Rockhampton.

History
Mount Morgan came into being with the discovery of gold in the area in 1882. It was established as the Borough of Mount Morgan on 22 May 1890, becoming the Town of Mount Morgan on 31 March 1903 with the enactment of the Local Authorities Act 1902. On 17 March 1909, the surrounding area, previously part of the Shire of Banana, was incorporated as the Shire of Calliungal, which had its offices in Mount Morgan. On 5 November 1931, the two merged to form the Shire of Mount Morgan.

On 15 March 2008, under the Local Government (Reform Implementation) Act 2007 passed by the Parliament of Queensland on 10 August 2007, the Shire of Mount Morgan merged with the City of Rockhampton and the Shires of Livingstone and Fitzroy to form the Rockhampton Region.

Towns and localities
The Shire of Mount Morgan included the following settlements:

 Mount Morgan
 Baree
 Hamilton Creek
 Horse Creek
 Moongan
 The Mine
 Walterhall

Chairmen and Mayors

Shire of Calliungal
 1927: Francis Sylvester Cunningham

Mayors of Town of Mount Morgan
 1906: J. H. Lundager
 D. Whitehead

Population

References

Former local government areas of Queensland
2008 disestablishments in Australia
Populated places disestablished in 2008